Moonlight Madness may refer to:
 Moonlight Madness (Teri DeSario album), album by Teri DeSario, 1979
 Moonlight Madness (Barry Gibb album), album by Barry Gibb, 1986
 "Moonlight Madness (song)", a song by Barry Gibb
 Moonlight Madness (video game), a 1986 computer game for the ZX Spectrum
 Moonlight Madness, an occasional sale happening until 2011 at Zellers stores